Henry G. Hager III (born April 28, 1934) is an American politician from Pennsylvania who served as a Republican member of the Pennsylvania State Senate for the 23rd district from 1973 to 1984 including as President pro tempore from 1981 to 1984.

Early life and education
Hager was born on April 28, 1934 in Williamsport, Pennsylvania to Dr. Henry G. and Eleanor Watt Hager.  He received a B.A. degree in 1956 from Wesleyan University and graduated from the University of Pennsylvania Law School in 1959.

Career
He served as the Lycoming County District Attorney from 1964 to 1968.

He joined the Pennsylvania State Senate for the 23rd district in November 1972 and was reelected in 1976 and 1980.  He advanced in the Republican caucus to minority leader and served as President pro tempore from 1981 to 1984.  He left the senate in 1984 and became president of the Insurance Federation of Pennsylvania.

Legacy
The Hager Lifelong Education Center at Pennsylvania College of Technology was named in his honor.

References

|-

1934 births
20th-century American lawyers
20th-century American politicians
County district attorneys in Pennsylvania
Living people
Pennsylvania lawyers
Republican Party Pennsylvania state senators
Politicians from Williamsport, Pennsylvania
Presidents pro tempore of the Pennsylvania Senate
University of Pennsylvania Law School alumni
Wesleyan University alumni